Flight of the Fly is a solo album by jazz pianist Jaki Byard.

Recording and music
The album was recorded for the French label Le Chant du Monde around 1976. The title track contains left-hand stride playing with right-hand hard bop lines. "Sweet Georgia Brown" begins as a ballad but then becomes a stride performance.

Track listing
"Flight of the Fly"
"Every Year/Stairway to the Stars/Love Is the Sweetest Thing"
"Sweet Georgia Brown"
"Graduation"
"The Avant Garde of 1921"

Personnel
Jaki Byard – piano

References

Jaki Byard albums
Solo piano jazz albums